Igor Vitalevich Dorofeyev (born August 10, 1968) is a Russian former professional ice hockey forward.

He played the majority of his career for HC Dynamo Moscow, winning 5 championships with the team and the 1991 Tampere Cup. He also played for Krylya Sovetov Moscow and Avangard Omsk, as well as HC Ambri-Piotta of the Swiss Nationalliga A, the Val Pusteral Wolves of Italy's Serie A and Oji Senshi Hockey of the Japan Ice Hockey League.

Career statistics

International statistics

External links

1968 births
Avangard Omsk players
HC Ambrì-Piotta players
HC Dynamo Moscow players
Krylya Sovetov Moscow players
Living people
Oji Eagles players
HC Pustertal Wölfe players
Russian ice hockey right wingers
Soviet ice hockey right wingers
Ice hockey people from Moscow
HC Vityaz players